Assawompset Pond is a reservoir/pond within the towns of Lakeville and Middleboro, in southeastern Massachusetts. It shares its waters with Long Pond and is openly connected with Pocksha Pond. These lakes provide a source of drinking water to the city of New Bedford, the largest city in southeastern Massachusetts. At almost , it is the largest natural lake in Massachusetts.

It is known in Wampanoag as Place of the White Stones and is host for the largest alewife (herring) run in the eastern seaboard. In the early spring the Nemasket River runs black with fish heading for the spawning grounds. The area known as Betty's Neck was one of the summer encampments for Native Americans who would traverse the Taunton River and Nemasket River to enter the pond. The Nemasket, being known as Where the fish are, explains the significance as a food source.

King Philip's War began with the discovery of John Sassamon's body and the subsequent trial of his suspected murderers. His body was slipped under the ice on Assawompset Pond and found the following spring. The outcome of the trial sparked the beginning of hostilities.

References

Taunton River watershed
Bodies of water of Plymouth County, Massachusetts
Lakeville, Massachusetts
Middleborough, Massachusetts
Ponds of Massachusetts
Reservoirs in Massachusetts
Wampanoag